Lee Byeong-jae (born April 20, 2000), better known by his stage name, Vinxen (stylized as VINXEN), is a South Korean rapper. He released his debut extended play, Smelting, in 2018, followed by the extended play, Boycold 2, later that year. He released his first full-length album, Boy to Man, in 2020.

Career

2018: Debut
In 2018, Lee participated in the South Korean reality show, High School Rapper 2 produced by Mnet. Lee finished in 3rd place. Lee released his first EP on May 9, 2018, titled "재련해도" and had a concert with label mate Ovan in March.

Lee collaborated with another High School Rapper 2 contestant, Haon, whilst on the show. The pair released the song "Bar Code" which swept the charts.

Artistry

Influences
Lee said that his influence is his label mate Ovan.

Discography

Studio albums

Extended plays

Singles

Filmography

Television shows

Awards and nominations

References

2000 births
Living people
South Korean male rappers
South Korean hip hop singers
21st-century South Korean  male singers